Tom Frager (born 1 July 1977 in Dakar, Senegal) is a French songwriter and performer in the group Gwayav' and is ten times a surfer winner in Guadeloupe. He is primarily known for his French hit "Lady Melody", which was number-one for four weeks.

Biography
Born in Senegal, Tom Frager grew up in Guadeloupe where he became the most successful local surfer of his generation. He moved to metropolitan France in 2000 and lived in Bordeaux. He joined the team of France and, with his guitar, wrote songs during his travels around the world for competitions.

Tom Frager mixed pop, rock, reggae, ska and jazz with original melodies and broken rhythm. His influences range from reggae by Bob Marley to rock by Sublime and pop soul by Jason Mraz.

Frager co-wrote with other artists, like Tom Curren and Keziah Jones' guitarist Amen Viana. He was on stage alongside Alpha Blondy, Toots & the Maytals, Patrice, Groundation, Sizzla, Sublime Tribute, the People of the Grass and performed on major festivals such as French Francofolies of La Rochelle or the Extravagance of Biarritz. Tom Frager & Gwayav' gave almost 400 concerts in a period of seven years.

Frager achieved national notability in September 2009 with his song "Lady Melody", which entered the French singles chart at number-one and stayed there for four weeks. The song was also number-one on the French digital chart. After the success of this first single from the album Better Days, a new single, "Give Me That Love", was scheduled to be released. The album had a peak at number five in August 2009.

Gwayav'
In 2002, he formed the group Gwayav' with four of his friends, musicians and surfers. Their debut album Bloom Inside sold nearly 5,000 copies.

Members
 Tom Frager: vocals, guitar
 Henry Daurel: guitar
 Janine Terhoff: chorus
 Carolina Carmona: chorus
 Stephane Garcia Tudela: drum kit
 Jerome Gron: piano
 Lionel Dubourdieu: bass
 Marc Closier: saxophone
 Thomas Renwick: guitar
 Fabrice Lefèvre: sound engineer

Discography

Albums
Tom Frager and Gwayav'

Singles
Tom Frager and Gwayav'

1 Digital Downloads

References

External links
 Official site
 Unofficial fan club

1977 births
Living people
French singer-songwriters
French surfers
People from Dakar
21st-century French singers
21st-century French male singers
French male singer-songwriters